The 2019 Bedford Borough Council election took place on 2 May 2019 to elect members of Bedford Borough Council in England.

Bedford Borough Council has been under no overall control since 2010. The Conservatives defended fifteen seats, Labour defended fourteen, the Liberal Democrats defended nine and independent councillors defended two seats. Bedford is run by the directly elected Mayor of Bedford, who has been Liberal Democrat Dave Hodgson since 2009.

Background 
Bedford Borough Council held local elections on 2 May 2019 along with councils across England as part of the 2019 local elections. The council elects its members in all-out elections, with all its councillors up for election every four years. Councillors defending their seats in this election were previously elected in 2015. In that election, fifteen Conservative councillors, fourteen Labour councillors, nine Labour councillors and two independent councillors were elected.

The same day Dave Hodgson (Liberal Democrat) was re-elected mayor in the 2019 Bedford Mayoral election.

Summary

Election result

|-

Council composition
Prior to the election the composition of the council was:

After the election the composition of the council was:

Ward results
Incumbent councillors are marked with an asterisk (*).

Brickhill

Bromham and Biddenham

Castle

Cauldwell

Clapham

De Parys

Eastcotts

Elstow and Stewartby

Goldington

Great Barford

Harpur

Harrold

Kempston Central and East

Kempston North

Kempston Rural

Kempston South

Kempston West

Kingsbrook

Newnham

Oakley

Putnoe

Queens Park

Riseley

Sharnbrook

Wilshamstead

Wootton

Wyboston

References

2019 English local elections
2019
21st century in Bedfordshire
May 2019 events in the United Kingdom